The following is a list of ecoregions in Turkmenistan, according to the Worldwide Fund for Nature (WWF):

Terrestrial

Temperate grasslands, savannas and shrublands
 Alai-Western Tian Shan steppe (Kazakhstan, Uzbekistan, Tajikistan, Turkmenistan)

Montane grasslands and shrublands
 Kopet Dag woodlands and forest steppe (Turkmenistan, Iran)

Deserts and xeric shrublands
 Badghyz and Karabil semi-desert (Turkmenistan, Afghanistan, Uzbekistan, Tajikistan)
 Caspian lowland desert (Iran, Kazakhstan, Russia, Turkmenistan)
 Central Asian riparian woodlands (Kazakhstan, Uzbekistan, Turkmenistan)
 Central Asian southern desert (Kazakhstan, Uzbekistan, Turkmenistan)
 Kopet Dag semi-desert (Turkmenistan, Iran)

 
ecoregions
Turkmenistan